Table tennis was inducted at the Youth Olympic Games at the inaugural edition in 2010. There's one singles event for both boys and girls. Moreover, a mixed-NOC team event is staged every Games.

Medal summaries

Boys' singles

Girls' singles

Mixed team

Medal table
As of the 2018 Summer Youth Olympics.

See also
Table tennis at the Summer Olympics

External links
Youth Olympic Games

 
Youth Olympics
Table tennis